Jonathan Andrew Vaughan (born July 1963) is a British double-bassist, academic and university administrator who is currently the Principal of the Guildhall School of Music and Drama. Prior to assuming the role of Principal, he was Vice-Principal and Director of Music from 2007 to 2021. He also previously held the posts of CEO and artistic director of the National Youth Orchestra of Great Britain and Chairman of the London Symphony Orchestra.

References

Living people

1963 births